Robert Chase is a character on the Fox medical drama House.

Robert Chase may also refer to:

 Robert Chase (businessman) (1938–2023), British businessman and former chairman of Norwich City Football Club
 Robert A. Chase (born 1923), American surgeon, researcher and educator
 Robert William Chase (1852–1927), British ornithologist, businessman, and philanthropist
 Rob Chase (born 1953), American politician, Washington state representative